Allan may refer to:

People 
 Allan (name), a given name and surname, including list of people and characters with this name

 Allan (footballer, born 1984) (Allan Barreto da Silva), Brazilian football striker
 Allan (footballer, born 1989) (Allan dos Santos Natividade), Brazilian football forward
 Allan (footballer, born 1991) (Allan Marques Loureiro), Brazilian football midfielder
 Allan (footballer, born 1994) (Allan Christian de Almeida), Brazilian football midfielder
 Allan (footballer, born 1997) (Allan Rodrigues de Souza), Brazilian football midfielder

Places
 Allan, Queensland, Australia
 Allan, Saskatchewan, Canada
 Allan, the Allaine river's lower course, in France
 Allan, Drôme, town in France
 Allan, Iran (disambiguation), places in Iran

Other uses
 Allan, a Clan Grant split (or sept) 
 Ahlawat or Allan, an ethnic clan in India
 Allan, a 1966 film directed by Donald Shebib
 "Allan" (song), a 1988 song recorded by the French artist Mylène Farmer
 Allan (magazine), Japanese magazine
 Allan of Rotterdam, a former train and tram manufacturer in the Netherlands
 Allan valve gear

See also 
 
 
 Alan (disambiguation)
 Alan (given name)
 Alleine
 Allen (disambiguation)

Estonian masculine given names